West High School is a public high school located on the west side of Columbus, Ohio, in the Westgate neighborhood in the Hilltop area. It is a part of Columbus City Schools.

History 
Due to overcrowding at Central High School in 1890s, a section of students split and were moved to another location, setting the foundation for what would become three new schools, including West High School.

Designed by the first architect of Columbus schools, David Riebel, the Neo-Classical Revival style building was constructed in 1908 and opened in 1909 on South Central Avenue. The building became Starling Middle School when the new West High School opened. The new West High School opened in 1929. It was designed by prominent Ohio architect Howard Dwight Smith who also designed Ohio Stadium.

West High School continues today at its current location at 179 South Powell Avenue. In August 2016, the cupola was removed because it was deemed unstable and a new cupola was installed and celebrated with a lighting ceremony in 2018.

The school colors are buff and brown. The school nickname is the Cowboys.

Extracurricular activities

Athletics
Sports include:

Basketball
Football
Cross-Country
Baseball/Softball
Volleyball
Soccer
Golf
Boys' Tennis/Girls' Tennis
Wrestling
Track and Field

Ohio High School Athletic Association State Championships

 Baseball - 1975

Notable alumni
 Johnny Edwards (baseball), Major League Baseball catcher for Cincinnati Reds and Houston Astros
 Michael Redd, NBA player for the Milwaukee Bucks
 Nancy Wilson, Jazz and Blues singer and three-time Grammy recipient
 Donn F. Eisele, NASA astronaut, flew on Apollo 7
 Joe Johns, CNN Reporter
 Aurealius Thomas, Football player Ohio State
 Jack Underman, Basketball player for Ohio State
 Richard E. Carey, U.S. Marine Corps Lieutenant General who organized and executed the American withdrawal from Saigon effectively ending US military operations in Southeast Asia

See also
Schools in Columbus, Ohio

References

External links
District Website
School Website
Teaching Columbus, History of Columbus Schools

High schools in Columbus, Ohio
Public high schools in Ohio
Endangered buildings in Columbus, Ohio